Paul Antony (born 27 June 1958) is a senior Indian Administrative Service (IAS) officer from Kerala who retired as the Chief Secretary, Government of Kerala. He belongs to 1983 Batch.  He is presently serving as Chairman, KSIDC

Career 
Antony started his career as Assistant Collector, Palakkad. He served as District Collector of Kollam and Alappuzha districts. He then served as Managing Director of Kerala State Civil Supplies Corporation, Development Commissioner of Cochin Export Processing Zone, Commissioner of Commercial Taxes, Principal Secretary in SC/ST Development Department and Power Department. He was the Chairman of Cochin Port Trust from 2011 to 2016. He then served as  Chairman, Kerala State Electricity Board. He was Additional Chief Secretary of Commerce and Industries department and Forest and wildlife department before his tenure as Chief Secretary. He succeeded Dr. K. M. Abraham as the Chief Secretary of Kerala. Antony retired in June 2018. In September 2021, he was appointed as Chairman of KSIDC.

References

Living people
1958 births
People from Thrissur
Indian Administrative Service officers from Kerala
Civil Servants from Kerala